"Twenty Eight" is a song by Canadian singer the Weeknd. It was recorded at Site Sound Studios and mixed at Liberty Studios in Toronto. Producers Doc McKinney and Illangelo co-wrote the song and performed all instrumentation.

The song was one of three bonus tracks included at the end of each of the compilation's discs from the Weeknd's 2012 album Trilogy. It was released as the album's second single on November 13, 2012, as a digital single by XO and Republic Records.

Music video
The music video for "Twenty Eight" premiered on February 13, 2013, on the Weeknd's YouTube account on Vevo. It was directed by photographer/director Nabil Elderkin. Since its release, the music video has received over 10 million views on YouTube. Due to the sexually explicit nature of the video, it has been age-restricted on YouTube.

Track listing

Personnel
Credits adapted from liner notes for Trilogy.

 The Weeknd – composer, primary artist
 Doc McKinney – composer, instrumentation, producer
 Carlo "Illangelo" Montagnese – composer, instrumentation, mixing, producer

Charts

Certifications

Release history

References

2012 songs
2012 singles
The Weeknd songs
Song recordings produced by Illangelo
Songs written by the Weeknd
Songs written by Illangelo
Music videos directed by Nabil Elderkin
Songs written by Doc McKinney
Republic Records singles
XO (record label) singles